Howard Clifton (July 1, 1939 – August 20, 1990) was an American bobsledder who competed in the late 1960s. He won a bronze medal in the two-man event at the 1967 FIBT World Championships in Alpe d'Huez. He also competed at the 1968 Winter Olympics.

References

External links
 Bobsleigh two-man world championship medalists since 1931

1939 births
1990 deaths
American male bobsledders
Place of birth missing
Olympic bobsledders of the United States
Bobsledders at the 1968 Winter Olympics